Top Country Albums is a chart that ranks the top-performing country music albums in the United States, published by Billboard.  Chart positions are based on multi-metric consumption, blending traditional album sales, track equivalent albums, and streaming equivalent albums.

In the issue of Billboard dated January 7, Morgan Wallen's Dangerous: The Double Album spent its 89th week at number one; since entering the chart at number one in January 2021 it had only spent 14 weeks off the top spot.  The album spend nine weeks atop the chart in 2023, taking its total to 97 weeks at number one, before Wallen replaced himself in the peak position in the issue dated March 18 with his next album, One Thing at a Time.

Chart history

See also
2023 in country music
List of Billboard number-one country songs of 2023

References

2023
United States Country Albums